Dream Baby may refer to:

 Dream Baby (How Long Must I Dream), a 1962 song by Roy Orbison
 covered by Glen Campbell, 1971
 covered by Lacy J. Dalton, 1983
 "Dream Baby", a song by Cher from the album All I Really Want to Do, 1965

See also
 Dream Boy (disambiguation)
 Dream Girl (disambiguation)